Lohals is a town in south Denmark, located in Langeland Municipality on the island of Langeland in Region of Southern Denmark.

References

Cities and towns in the Region of Southern Denmark
Langeland Municipality